Central Catalan is an Eastern Catalan dialect spoken in the whole province of Barcelona, the eastern half of the province of Tarragona and most of the province of Girona, except for its northern part, where a transition to Northern Catalan begins.

This variety (when free of localisms from Barcelona, Tarragona or Girona) is perceived by most Catalans as the standard form in Catalonia. As such, it is the variety used in most written and audiovisual media, as well as in learning materials.

Empordanese Catalan 
In the Empordà region of Catalonia there is a distinctive Empordanese subdialect. As evidenced in writings from the turn of the 19th century by authors such as Joaquim Ruyra, differences between Empordanese and Barcelonese were formerly more pronounced in such areas of usage as the salat definite article (which is still common in Balearic Catalan). In the books of Ruyra there are signs of a clear state of diglossia: the more cultured figures, including the narrator, use the standard Barcelona dialect, whilst the local fishermen employ their own dialect.

Some of the chief differences are:

hai, fai, vai, etc. for haig, faig, vaig ('I have', 'I make',  'I go', etc.)

mon, ton, son, etc. for el meu, el teu, el seu, etc. ('mine', 'yours', 'his', etc.) - these variations are not only restricted to the Empordanese Catalan, but are also in use, albeit not often, in Central Catalan and are generally understood by all Central Catalan speakers.

con and contes for quan/quant and quantes ('when', 'which (m. sing., f. pl.))

An inversion of the weak forms of the personal pronouns: me, te, se instead of em, et, es ('me', 'you', 'him').

The use of a 3rd person subjunctive ending in u instead of i: llamp me matu for llamp em mati ('strike me down', lit. "lightning kill me").

sebre for saber ('to know') with an irregular past participle (sapigut for sabut, 'known').

The Christian colonization of the Balearics was primarily done with settlers from this region and so both dialects share several similarities, most obviously the use of the salat definite article (practically extinct in Empordanese but still common in Balearic varieties).

In addition, some synonyms are more preferred to their Standard Catalan equivalents, for example capir, capieixo, for entendre, entenc ('to understand', 'I understand') and testa for cap ('head') which share a closer similarity to modern Italian (capire, capisco / testa) than Standard Catalan.

Text example
Excerpt from the Parable of the Prodigal Son extracted from the works of 19th-century linguist Manuel Milà i Fontanals, who wrote extensively about Catalan dialectal differences:

Notes

References 
 Upper Empordanese Dictionary

See also
Catalan / Valencian
Algherese
Northern Catalan
Balearic dialect

Catalan dialects